Brushy Creek may refer to:

Streams

Australia 
Brushy Creek (Melbourne), a creek in the eastern suburbs of Melbourne

United States 
Brushy Creek (Platte River), a stream in Iowa and Missouri
Brushy Creek (Beaver Creek), a stream in Taney County, Missouri
Brushy Creek (Big Creek), a stream in Henry County, Missouri
Brushy Creek (Black River), a stream in Carter and Wayne counties in Missouri
Brushy Creek (Deepwater Creek), a stream in Bates and Henry counties in Missouri
Brushy Creek (Fishing River), a stream in Clay County, Missouri
Brushy Creek (Gravois Creek), a stream in Morgan County, Missouri
Brushy Creek (Saint Johns Creek), a stream in Franklin County, Missouri
Brushy Creek (Saline Creek), a stream in Ste. Genevieve County, Missouri
Brushy Creek (Meade County, South Dakota)
Brushy Creek (Perkins County, South Dakota)
Brushy Creek (San Gabriel River tributary), a creek in Williamson County, Texas

Communities
Brushy Creek, Anderson County, Texas
Brushy Creek, Williamson County, Texas, a census-designated place

Other
Brushy Creek (Greenville, South Carolina), a historic home
Brushy Creek Ruin, a National Register of Historic Places listing in Hidalgo County, New Mexico
Brushy Creek State Recreation Area, Iowa

See also
Brushy Branch, a stream in Missouri
Brushy Fork (Tavern Creek tributary), Missouri
Brushy Fork (Pauls Creek tributary), North Carolina